Alex Ash Bertie (born 2 November 1995) is a transgender YouTuber, author and graphic designer from Dorset, England.

He presents content on YouTube centred around LGBTQ+ issues and his experiences transitioning as a trans man. His channel, "Alex Bertie", has around 300,000 subscribers.

He has been featured as an LGBTQ+ panelist for Summer in the City, a gathering for the UK YouTube community in London, in 2014, 2015,  2016, 2017 and 2018.

In 2017, he published an autobiography of his transition journey entitled Trans Mission: My Quest to a Beard through a Hachette Children's Group imprint; Wren & Rook.

Early life and education 
Alex Ash Bertie was born 2 November 1995 to parents including Paul, a postman. The family, including Alex's younger sister, live in the seaside town of Bournemouth, Dorset, England. He was assigned female at birth but early on showed a tendency toward masculine interests usually seen in young boys. He liked action figures, toy cars, Lego, and cherished video games. Among his favourite memories was sitting aside his father while Paul played Nintendo and Dreamcast. In primary school all his friends were male. He experienced bullying for a three-year stretch because of his perceived non-heterosexuality, and also dealt with depression because of how society treated his gender dysphoria. He engaged in self-harm cutting, but later found relief from an LGBTQ-affirming group, Over the Rainbow, that shared information about transgender people.

Bertie publicly identified as female until fifteen years old, when he came out as a trans man to his family, friends, and online following. He vlogged his multi-year transition starting in 2008 when he was thirteen, on YouTube later calling the online sharing his "safe space". He originally sought more transitioning information on YouTube, but decided to share his experiences after finding little available. PopBuzz noted, "this kind of insight into a real person transitioning on a daily basis is fundamental for children either struggling with this concept or wanting to learn more about it for themselves". After struggling for family acceptance, in April 2016 he began hormone replacement treatment at The Laurels Gender Identity Clinic in Exeter, England. His younger sister embraced his gender transitioning first, his parents took longer but are now extremely supportive. In January 2017, he underwent a double mastectomy procedure (Peri-Areolar technique) by Andrew Yelland at the Nuffield Hospital, Brighton. He titled his YouTube channel "The Quest to Alex's Beard" and included the highs and lows of the journey, including his family's slowly accepting his transition, so that other young trans men and women could see "it gets better". In October 2017, The Mail on Sunday published photos of Bertie without permission alongside what PinkNews characterized as the latest in a series of anti-trans articles.

As of 2018 Bertie is holding off on bottom surgery to give him genitalia that match his gender identity. The two present surgery options are too risky, he awaits advances in the field.

Career 
He presents content on YouTube centred around LGBTQ+ issues and his experiences transitioning as a trans man. His channel, "Alex Bertie", has over 300,000 subscribers.

He has been featured as an LGBTQ+ panelist for Summer in the City, a gathering for the UK YouTube community in London, in 2014, 2015, 2016, 2017 and 2018.

In 2017, he published an autobiography of his transition journey entitled Trans Mission: My Quest to a Beard through a Hachette Children's Group imprint; Wren & Rook.

Personal life 
Alex identifies as pansexual after openly expressing a sexual/romantic interest regardless of gender identity, although he mainly has been dating other trans men.

Bertie dated fellow YouTuber Jake Edwards since 2014. The pair often make videos together online to their respective channels, as well as to an inactive channel 'Alex & Jake'. Their online fan base commonly refers to the two as 'AJthorki' or 'Jalex'. They broke up in 2018.

Awards and recognition 
In 2018, Bertie won the Lovie Award from the International Academy of Digital Arts and Sciences for Creator for Change recognizing the best on the internet in Europe.

References

1995 births
Living people
LGBT YouTubers
Pansexual men
People from Dorset
Transgender men
Transgender writers
20th-century English LGBT people
21st-century English LGBT people